Latonia Moore (born 1979, in Houston, Texas) is an American soprano. She grew up listening to Black music, and began singing in the church choir of the New Sunrise Baptist Church (where her grandfather Cranford Moore was a pastor) at age 8. In her youth, she sang in the Texas All-State Choir.

Moore first studied gospel and jazz, until Pattye Johnstone, one of her teachers at the University of North Texas convinced her to study classical music. Moore made her debut in 1998 at the Palm Beach Opera in West Palm Beach, and was engaged as a student in the same year at the Houston Ebony Opera. She continued as a student of Bill Schuman at the Academy of Vocal Arts, in Philadelphia, where she graduated in 2005. In 2000 she won the Metropolitan Opera National Council Auditions.

In New York City, Moore attracted critical praise for her 2008 performance with the Opera Orchestra of New York in Puccini's Edgar. In March 2012, she made her Metropolitan Opera debut as a late replacement for Violeta Urmana on short notice as Aida in a live broadcast.

Moore is featured on commercial recordings of the Mahler Symphony No 2 (Deutsche Grammophon 0289 474 5942 2) and of Verdi's Macbeth (sung in English, Chandos CHAN 3180(2)).

In January 2016, Moore performed for the newly revived New York City Opera in Puccini's Tosca at the Rose Theater in Lincoln Center.

In April 2016, she sang the lead role of Cio-Cio San in the San Diego Opera's performance of Puccini's Madama Butterfly, garnering critical recognition for her acting, her "rich, supple and multi-octave soprano voice" and vocal interpretation.

Moore appeared in 2018 with Opera Australia in the title role of Puccini's Tosca, delivering a critically acclaimed "complex performance" with a voice of "luxurious colour and brilliance at the top".

Recordings

 Symphony No. 2 by Gustav Mahler, cond. Gilbert Kaplan, Wiener Musikverein 2003, (Deutsche Grammophon)
 Macbeth (Lady Macbeth) by Giuseppe Verdi sung in English, 2014, Studio (Chandos)

References

External links 
 
 Promethean Artists page on Latonia Moore
 Hamburg State Opera German-language biography of Latonia Moore
 The Licia Albanese-Puccini Foundation, Past Winners – 2002 International Vocal Competition
 Robert J Farr & Ralph Moore, Reviews of Chandos CHAN 3180(2), Music Web International, 14 April 2014

American operatic sopranos
University of North Texas College of Music alumni
Musicians from Houston
Academy of Vocal Arts alumni
21st-century African-American women singers
21st-century American women opera singers
African-American women opera singers
1979 births
Living people
Winners of the Metropolitan Opera National Council Auditions
Classical musicians from Texas
Singers from Texas